Henry Ryan may refer to:

Henry Ryan (minister) (1775–1794), US-Canadian Methodist minister
Henry Ryan (politician) (1873–1943), member of the Queensland Legislative Assembly

See also 
Harry Ryan (disambiguation)